Literary Short Novel Casino de Mieres (Premio de Novela Casino de Mieres)  is a Spanish literary prize awarded annually since 1980 in Mieres (Asturias) to an original and unpublished short novel. It is selected by an Award Committee consisting of  great personalities from Asturias Literary and Arts circle.

History 
The Prize was established in 1980 by the President of Sociedad Casino de Mieres, Mr. Luis San Narciso Altamira, with a sponsorship deal from financial institution Cajastur.  
Initially, the award was formed by the first edition of the novel and an economic prize of 100.000 pesetas.

From its formation the Prize enjoys great prestige and its recognition has grown up remarkably, being considered nowadays as one of the most important Spanish literary prizes regarding reputation and quality of novels. Writers from Spain, Europe and South America have taken part in the running last years.

In 1996 the President of Cajastur, Mr. Manuel Menéndez Menéndez, decided to set the prize money at one million of pesetas (about ), given its notoriety and trajectory.

At present 
Currently this prize is awarded annually during a special ceremony called "Café Literario", in the second week of June, coinciding with Mieres Patron Saint's Day.

Many personalities from cultural scene attend this ceremony, in the Salón de los Espejos in Casino de Mieres facilities, and the Jury presents finalist works and the winner novel.

In fall a new celebration ceremony is carried out also in Mieres for the book launch, which is edited by KRK Ediciones from 2005.

Contestants and award 
All writers can participate, regardless of nationality, proposing original and unpublished works, from 80 to 130 pages, written in Spanish.

The Award is formed by the first edition of the novel and a monetary reward of 6,600 €.

Winning novels and awarded authors

See also 
 List of literary awards
 Spanish literature

References 
 Award

https://web.archive.org/web/20120321100151/http://becas.universia.es/ES/beca/55366/xxxii-premio-novela-casino-mieres.html

 Victor Alperi (member of the jury)

http://www.vivirasturias.com/asturias/mieres/alperi,-victor/es

http://fusionasturias.com/entrevistas/entrevistas/cada-escritor-tiene-un-mundo-personal-victor-alperi-escritor.htm

 Faustino F. Álvarez (member of the jury)

https://web.archive.org/web/20120328055109/http://archivo.lavozdeasturias.es/html/42411.html

 Ramón Hernández (member of the jury)

http://www.aache.com/alcarrians/hernandez.htm

 Celso Antuña Suárez (member of the jury)

https://web.archive.org/web/20120328113448/http://www.abogadoantunasuarez.com/ /

Spanish literary awards